Tranby (Peninsula Farm) is an historic farmers cottage located on Johnson Road in Maylands overlooking the Swan River opposite Kuljak Island, and is one of the oldest surviving buildings from the early settlement of the Swan River Colony.   It is described as an English cottage-style farmhouse with loft bedrooms and wide verandahs and is associated with a group of devout Wesleyan Methodists, led by Joseph Hardey and other members of his family, who arrived in Western Australia on the ship Tranby in February 1830.

History

The Tranby was a 26-metre-long, 8-metre-wide ship which left from the city of Hull in Yorkshire, England on 9 September 1829 and was captained by a John Story.  37 passengers and fourteen crew were on board as well as various livestock, farm equipment and building materials.

Joseph Hardey was a Wesleyan preacher from Lincolnshire. He arrived with his wife Ann, his brother John and a large group which included a surgeon, preacher, bricklayer, blacksmith, shoemaker, surveyor, hatter, midshipman and several farmers. Subsequent grants of additional  followed up to 1844. The property was known as Peninsula Farm and now forms much of the current suburb of Maylands.

Hardey's first house was built in May 1830, probably from material brought out on the Tranby. It was located on the low land about 100 metres downstream from the location of the present house. This house was destroyed by flood in July, and Hardey built a new house of wattle and daub, with a thatched roof, the following year. It is not known where this second house was located, although it also is believed to have been destroyed by flood. By June 1839, construction of the current house was completed, making it one of the oldest brick houses in the State and the earliest domestic residence still extant in the inner metropolitan area.

After the property was divided in 1903, the existing lot which includes the house remained as the Hardy family home until 1913 when it was bought by Henry Baker. It was named Tranby House in 1923, the state's centenary year, in recognition of its historical significance. In 1951 the property changed hands again and in 1967 was bought by Bond Corporation who demolished the barn and some small cottages with a view to a redevelopment on the site. Following a public debate opposing the plans, the property was acquired by the National Trust of Australia in 1972, and after an extensive restoration, was opened to the public by Lady Kyle, wife of the Governor, Sir Wallace Kyle on 27 November 1977. It continues today as a popular tourist attraction and tearooms.

Several oak, olive and mulberry trees believed to have been planted by the Hardey family remain and surround the house.   Two of the oak trees were listed on the National Trust's Register of Significant Trees in 1984.

The house is furnished in the style of the first half of the 19th century; all furniture is authentic, but has come from various sources. The only furniture known to have belonged to the Hardeys is a regency style brass four-poster bed, which is on permanent loan from the Royal Western Australian Historical Society; a polished wooden medicine chest; and the timber lid of a packing case.

References

Further reading
Apperly, R., Irving, R., Reynolds, P. (1989) A Pictorial Guide to Identifying Australian Architecture, Styles and Terms from 1788 to the Present (Angus and Robertson, North Ryde) pp. 42–45.Australian Heritage Commission Data Sheet.
Campbell, R. McK. and van Bremen, I., H., (1992) Tranby House, Peninsula Farm, Maylands (Conservation Report for Boat Torque Cruises) pp. 3, 4, 7, 8, 10 & 16.
Lutton, W., (1970) The Wesley Story, Centenary of Wesley Church, Perth, Western Australia 1870 - 1970 (A4 brochure, no pagination, Perth, Wesley Church, pp. 1–2)
Molyneux, I. (1981) Looking Around Perth (Wescolour Press, East Fremantle, p. 2. National Trust Assessment Exposition.
Richards, O., (1990) Conservation Master Plan for Tranby House Grounds, Maylands Peninsula, Western Australia (prepared for the National Trust, WA) pp. 2, 3, 4, 5, 7, 15 & 16.
Stannage, C., T., (1979) The People of Perth. A Social History of Western Australia's Capital City pp. 9, 38, 81,102, 103 & 120.
Swan River Heritage Trail (WA Heritage Trails Network, Perth 1988).
King, Sue. National Trust. 1996. Tour Through Time, Pilot Project - A Study of WA Metropolitan Trust Properties (Secondary Education).

External links
 
 

Houses completed in 1839
Tourist attractions in Perth, Western Australia
Maylands, Western Australia
National Trust of Western Australia
Historic house museums in Western Australia
State Register of Heritage Places in the City of Bayswater